is a Japanese voice actress and child model from Tokyo, Japan.  She is represented by Oscar Promotion. Her major roles in anime are Lucia Nanami in Mermaid Melody: Pichi Pichi Pitch and Yasura in Himawari.

Biography 
When she was three years old, Nakada began to work in show business with her younger sister. In 1997, at the age of nine, she debuted as a singer in the duo Crybaby (Pony Canyon, produced by Seiji Toda) with Ayano Shiraishi.

In April 2003, she performed her first voice acting role in the Japanese anime series Mermaid Melody Pichi Pichi Pitch as the heroine Lucia Nanami. There, she performed a theme song of Mermaid Melody Pichi Pichi Pitch, "Legend of Mermaid".
She also provides the voice of Yusura in the anime series Himawari!, broadcast from April 2006.

Filmography

Anime

Video games

Film

Discography

CDs 

 Splash Dream (2003)
 Mother Symphony (2004)

Radio

References

External links 
 Official agency profile 
 Asumi Nakada's Beamie site 
 
 Prolog Vol.10:  crybaby  - at "Prolog", August 1997
 "Girls on the Web" FILE.15: crybaby (July 1, 1997)  - Her interview and photo gallery

1988 births
Japanese female models
Japanese film actresses
Japanese television actresses
Japanese video game actresses
Japanese voice actresses
Japanese child actresses
Living people
Actresses from Tokyo
20th-century Japanese actresses
21st-century Japanese actresses